Kathaleen "Kathy" Fedorjaka (born October 16, 1968) was the head women's basketball coach at Bucknell University. In 15 seasons at Bucknell, she posted a 209–211 record. She owns an overall 276–249 record. She also coached at Connecticut College and Bloomsburg. In 2003, she led Bucknell to its first ever NCAA tournament appearance, after a 21–10 mark. In 1998, she was named the Patriot League Coach of the Year.  Kathy Fedorjaka has also led her team to the NCAA's again in 2008 but losing to the North Carolina Tar Heels.

Playing career

Fedorjaka graduated from Fairfield University in 1990 where she was a four-year member of the basketball team. Fedorjaka served as co-captain during her senior season when she averaged 12.7 points per game. In addition, Fedorjaka was named to the MAAC All-Academic Team, received the Fairfield Scholar Athlete of the Year Award, and was presented the ECAC Medal of Merit Award. As a sophomore in 1987–88, Fedorjaka helped lead the Stags to the first NCAA tournament appearance in school history.

Head coaching record

References

External links
Kathy Fedorjaka bio

Bucknell Bison women's basketball coaches
Living people
Fairfield University alumni
1968 births
American women's basketball coaches
Fairfield Stags women's basketball players
Connecticut College Camels coaches